Mason Flesch (born 18 November 1999) is a Canadian rugby union player, currently playing for the Toronto Arrows of Major League Rugby (MLR) and the Canadian national team. His preferred position is flanker.

Professional career
Flesch signed for Major League Rugby side Toronto Arrows for the 2021 Major League Rugby season. Flesch made his debut for Canada in the 2023 Rugby World Cup Qualifiers.

References

External links
itsrugby.co.uk Profile

1999 births
Living people
Canadian rugby union players
Canada international rugby union players
Rugby union flankers
People from Cobourg
Toronto Arrows players